A neurotransmitter is a signaling molecule secreted by a neuron to affect another cell across a synapse. The cell receiving the signal, or target cell, may be another neuron, but could also be a gland or muscle cell.

Neurotransmitters are released from synaptic vesicles into the synaptic cleft where they are able to interact with neurotransmitter receptors on the target cell. The neurotransmitter's effect on the target cell is determined by the receptor it binds. Many neurotransmitters are synthesized from simple and plentiful precursors such as amino acids, which are readily available and often require a small number of biosynthetic steps for conversion.

Neurotransmitters are essential to the function of complex neural systems. The exact number of unique neurotransmitters in humans is unknown, but more than 100 have been identified. Common neurotransmitters include glutamate, GABA, acetylcholine, glycine and norepinephrine.

Mechanism and cycle

Synthesis

Neurotransmitters are generally synthesized in neurons and are made up of, or derived from, precursor molecules that are found abundantly in the cell. Classes of neurotransmitters include amino acids, monoamines, and peptides. Monoamines are synthesized by altering a single amino acid. For example, the precursor of serotonin is the amino acid tryptophan. Peptide transmitters, or neuropeptides, are protein transmitters that often are released together with other transmitters to have a modulatory effect. Purine neurotransmitters, like ATP, are derived from nucleic acids. Other neurotransmitters are made up of metabolic products like nitric oxide and carbon monoxide.

Storage

Neurotransmitters are generally stored in synaptic vesicles, clustered close to the cell membrane at the axon terminal of the presynaptic neuron. However, some neurotransmitters, like the metabolic gases carbon monoxide and nitric oxide, are synthesized and released immediately following an action potential without ever being stored in vesicles.

Release

Generally, a neurotransmitter is released at the presynaptic terminal in response to an electrical signal called an action potential in the presynaptic neuron. However, low level 'baseline' release also occurs without electrical stimulation. Neurotransmitters are released into and diffuse across the synaptic cleft, where they bind to specific receptors on the membrane of the postsynaptic neuron.

Receptor interaction

After being released into the synaptic cleft, neurotransmitters diffuse across the synapse where they are able to interact with receptors on the target cell. The effect of the neurotransmitter is dependent on the identity of the target cell's receptors present at the synapse. Depending on the receptor, binding of neurotransmitters may cause excitation, inhibition, or modulation of the postsynaptic neuron. See below for more information.

Elimination

In order to avoid continuous activation of receptors on the post-synaptic or target cell, neurotransmitters must be removed from the synaptic cleft.  Neurotransmitters are removed through one of three mechanisms:

 Diffusion – neurotransmitters drift out of the synaptic cleft, where they are absorbed by glial cells. These glial cells, usually astrocytes, absorb the excess neurotransmitters. In the glial cell, neurotransmitters are broken down by enzymes or pumped back into
 Enzyme degradation – proteins called enzymes break the neurotransmitters down.
 Reuptake – neurotransmitters are reabsorbed into the pre-synaptic neuron. Transporters, or membrane transport proteins, pump neurotransmitters from the synaptic cleft back into axon terminals (the presynaptic neuron) where they are stored for reuse.

For example, acetylcholine is eliminated by having its acetyl group cleaved by the enzyme acetylcholinesterase; the remaining choline is then taken in and recycled by the pre-synaptic neuron to synthesize more acetylcholine. Other neurotransmitters are able to diffuse away from their targeted synaptic junctions and are eliminated from the body via the kidneys, or destroyed in the liver. Each neurotransmitter has very specific degradation pathways at regulatory points, which may be targeted by the body's regulatory system or medication. Cocaine blocks a dopamine transporter responsible for the reuptake of dopamine. Without the transporter, dopamine diffuses much more slowly from the synaptic cleft and continues to activate the dopamine receptors on the target cell.

Discovery

Until the early 20th century, scientists assumed that the majority of synaptic communication in the brain was electrical. However, through histological examinations by Ramón y Cajal, a 20 to 40 nm gap between neurons, known today as the synaptic cleft, was discovered. The presence of such a gap suggested communication via chemical messengers traversing the synaptic cleft, and in 1921 German pharmacologist Otto Loewi confirmed that neurons can communicate by releasing chemicals. Through a series of experiments involving the vagus nerves of frogs, Loewi was able to manually slow the heart rate of frogs by controlling the amount of saline solution present around the vagus nerve. Upon completion of this experiment, Loewi asserted that sympathetic regulation of cardiac function can be mediated through changes in chemical concentrations. Furthermore, Otto Loewi is credited with discovering acetylcholine (ACh) – the first known neurotransmitter.

Identification
There are four main criteria for identifying neurotransmitters:
 The chemical must be synthesized in the neuron or otherwise be present in it. 
 When the neuron is active, the chemical must be released and produce a response in some targets. 
 The same response must be obtained when the chemical is experimentally placed on the target. 
 A mechanism must exist for removing the chemical from its site of activation after its work is done.

However, given advances in pharmacology, genetics, and chemical neuroanatomy, the term "neurotransmitter" can be applied to chemicals that:
 Carry messages between neurons via influence on the postsynaptic membrane.
 Have little or no effect on membrane voltage, but have a common carrying function such as changing the structure of the synapse. 
 Communicate by sending reverse-direction messages that affect the release or reuptake of transmitters.

The anatomical localization of neurotransmitters is typically determined using immunocytochemical techniques, which identify the location of either the transmitter substances themselves or of the enzymes that are involved in their synthesis. Immunocytochemical techniques have also revealed that many transmitters, particularly the neuropeptides, are co-localized, that is, a neuron may release more than one transmitter from its synaptic terminal. Various techniques and experiments such as staining, stimulating, and collecting can be used to identify neurotransmitters throughout the central nervous system.

Actions 
Neurons form elaborate networks through which nerve impulses – action potentials – travel. Each neuron has as many as 15,000 connections with neighboring neurons.

Neurons do not touch each other (except in the case of an electrical synapse through a gap junction); instead, neurons interact at contact points called synapses: a junction within two nerve cells, consisting of a miniature gap within which impulses are carried by a neurotransmitter. A neuron transports its information by way of a nerve impulse called an action potential. When an action potential arrives at the synapse's presynaptic terminal button, it may stimulate the release of neurotransmitters. These neurotransmitters are released into the synaptic cleft to bind onto the receptors of the postsynaptic membrane and influence another cell, either in an inhibitory or excitatory way. The next neuron may be connected to many more neurons, and if the total of excitatory influences minus inhibitory influences is great enough, it will also "fire". That is to say, it will create a new action potential at its axon hillock, releasing neurotransmitters and passing on the information to yet another neighboring neuron.

Modulation 
A neurotransmitter may have an excitatory, inhibitory or modulatory effect on the target cell. The effect is determined by the receptors the neurotransmitter interacts with at the post-synaptic membrane. Neurotransmitter influences trans-membrane ion flow either to increase (excitatory) or to decrease (inhibitory) the probability that the cell with which it comes in contact will produce an action potential. Synapses containing receptors with excitatory effects are called Type I synapses, while Type II synapses contain receptors with inhibitory effects. Thus, despite the wide variety of synapses, they all convey messages of only these two types. The two types are different appearance and are primarily located on different parts of the neurons under its influence. Receptors with modulatory effects are spread throughout all synaptic membranes and binding of neurotransmitters sets in motion signaling cascades that help the cell regulate its function. Binding of neurotransmitters to receptors with modulatory effects can have many results. For example, it may result in an increase or decrease in sensitivity to future stimulus by recruiting more or less receptors to the synaptic membrane.

Type I (excitatory) synapses are typically located on the shafts or the spines of dendrites, whereas type II (inhibitory) synapses are typically located on a cell body. In addition, Type I synapses have round synaptic vesicles, whereas the vesicles of type II synapses are flattened. The material on the presynaptic and post-synaptic membranes is denser in a Type I synapse than it is in a type II, and the type I synaptic cleft is wider. Finally, the active zone on a Type I synapse is larger than that on a Type II synapse.

The different locations of type I and type II synapses divide a neuron into two zones: an excitatory dendritic tree and an inhibitory cell body. From an inhibitory perspective, excitation comes in over the dendrites and spreads to the axon hillock to trigger an action potential. If the message is to be stopped, it is best stopped by applying inhibition on the cell body, close to the axon hillock where the action potential originates. Another way to conceptualize excitatory–inhibitory interaction is to picture excitation overcoming inhibition. If the cell body is normally in an inhibited state, the only way to generate an action potential at the axon hillock is to reduce the cell body's inhibition. In this "open the gates" strategy, the excitatory message is like a racehorse ready to run down the track, but first, the inhibitory starting gate must be removed.

Neurotransmitter actions
As explained above, the only direct action of a neurotransmitter is to activate a receptor. Therefore, the effects of a neurotransmitter system depend on the connections of the neurons that use the transmitter, and the chemical properties of the receptors.

Glutamate is used at the great majority of fast excitatory synapses in the brain and spinal cord. It is also used at most synapses that are "modifiable", i.e. capable of increasing or decreasing in strength. Modifiable synapses are thought to be the main memory-storage elements in the brain. Excessive glutamate release can overstimulate the brain and lead to excitotoxicity causing cell death resulting in seizures or strokes. Excitotoxicity has been implicated in certain chronic diseases including ischemic stroke, epilepsy, amyotrophic lateral sclerosis, Alzheimer's disease, Huntington disease, and Parkinson's disease.
GABA is used at the great majority of fast inhibitory synapses in virtually every part of the brain. Many sedative/tranquilizing drugs act by enhancing the effects of GABA. Correspondingly, glycine is the inhibitory transmitter in the spinal cord.
Acetylcholine was the first neurotransmitter discovered in the peripheral and central nervous systems. It activates skeletal muscles in the somatic nervous system and may either excite or inhibit internal organs in the autonomic system. It is distinguished as the transmitter at the neuromuscular junction connecting motor nerves to muscles. The paralytic arrow-poison curare acts by blocking transmission at these synapses. Acetylcholine also operates in many regions of the brain, but using different types of receptors, including nicotinic and muscarinic receptors.
Dopamine has a number of important functions in the brain; this includes regulation of motor behavior, pleasures related to motivation and also emotional arousal. It plays a critical role in the reward system; Parkinson's disease has been linked to low levels of dopamine and schizophrenia has been linked to high levels of dopamine.
Serotonin is a monoamine neurotransmitter. Most is produced by and found in the intestine (approximately 90%), and the remainder in central nervous system neurons. It functions to regulate appetite, sleep, memory and learning, temperature, mood, behaviour, muscle contraction, and function of the cardiovascular system and endocrine system. It is speculated to have a role in depression, as some depressed patients are seen to have lower concentrations of metabolites of serotonin in their cerebrospinal fluid and brain tissue.
Norepinephrine which is synthesized in the central nervous system and sympathetic nerves, modulates the responses of the autonomic nervous system, the sleep patterns, focus and alertness. It is synthesized from tyrosine.
Epinephrine which is also synthesized from tyrosine is released in the adrenal glands and the brainstem. It plays a role in sleep, with one's ability to become and stay alert, and the fight-or-flight response.

Types 
There are many different ways to classify neurotransmitters. Dividing them into amino acids, peptides, and monoamines is sufficient for some classification purposes.

Major neurotransmitters:
Amino acids: glutamate, aspartate, D-serine, gamma-Aminobutyric acid (GABA), glycine
Gasotransmitters: nitric oxide (NO), carbon monoxide (CO), hydrogen sulfide (H2S)
Monoamines:
Catecholamines: dopamine (DA), norepinephrine (noradrenaline, NE), epinephrine (adrenaline)
Indolamines: serotonin (5-HT, SER), melatonin
histamine
Trace amines: phenethylamine, N-methylphenethylamine, tyramine, 3-iodothyronamine, octopamine, tryptamine, etc.
Peptides: oxytocin, somatostatin, substance P, cocaine and amphetamine regulated transcript, opioid peptides
Purines: adenosine triphosphate (ATP), adenosine
Others: acetylcholine (ACh), anandamide, etc.

In addition, over 100 neuroactive peptides have been found, and new ones are discovered regularly. Many of these are co-released along with a small-molecule transmitter. Nevertheless, in some cases, a peptide is the primary transmitter at a synapse. Beta-Endorphin is a relatively well-known example of a peptide neurotransmitter because it engages in highly specific interactions with opioid receptors in the central nervous system.

Single ions (such as synaptically released zinc) are also considered neurotransmitters by some, as well as some gaseous molecules such as nitric oxide (NO), carbon monoxide (CO), and hydrogen sulfide (H2S). The gases are produced in the neural cytoplasm and are immediately diffused through the cell membrane into the extracellular fluid and into nearby cells to stimulate production of second messengers. Soluble gas neurotransmitters are difficult to study, as they act rapidly and are immediately broken down, existing for only a few seconds.

The most prevalent transmitter is glutamate, which is excitatory at well over 90% of the synapses in the human brain. The next most prevalent is gamma-Aminobutyric Acid, or GABA, which is inhibitory at more than 90% of the synapses that do not use glutamate. Although other transmitters are used in fewer synapses, they may be very important functionally: the great majority of psychoactive drugs exert their effects by altering the actions of some neurotransmitter systems, often acting through transmitters other than glutamate or GABA. Addictive drugs such as cocaine and amphetamines exert their effects primarily on the dopamine system. The addictive opiate drugs exert their effects primarily as functional analogs of opioid peptides, which, in turn, regulate dopamine levels.

List of neurotransmitters, peptides, and gaseous signaling molecules

Brain neurotransmitter systems 
Neurons expressing certain types of neurotransmitters sometimes form distinct systems, where activation of the system affects large volumes of the brain, called volume transmission. Major neurotransmitter systems include the noradrenaline (norepinephrine) system, the dopamine system, the serotonin system, and the cholinergic system, among others. Trace amines have a modulatory effect on neurotransmission in monoamine pathways (i.e., dopamine, norepinephrine, and serotonin pathways) throughout the brain via signaling through trace amine-associated receptor 1. A brief comparison of these systems follows:

Drug effects
Understanding the effects of drugs on neurotransmitters comprises a significant portion of research initiatives in the field of neuroscience. Most neuroscientists involved in this field of research believe that such efforts may further advance our understanding of the circuits responsible for various neurological diseases and disorders, as well as ways to effectively treat and someday possibly prevent or cure such illnesses.

Drugs can influence behavior by altering neurotransmitter activity. For instance, drugs can decrease the rate of synthesis of neurotransmitters by affecting the synthetic enzyme(s) for that neurotransmitter. When neurotransmitter syntheses are blocked, the amount of neurotransmitters available for release becomes substantially lower, resulting in a decrease in neurotransmitter activity. Some drugs block or stimulate the release of specific neurotransmitters.  Alternatively, drugs can prevent neurotransmitter storage in synaptic vesicles by causing the synaptic vesicle membranes to leak. Drugs that prevent a neurotransmitter from binding to its receptor are called receptor antagonists. For example, drugs used to treat patients with schizophrenia such as haloperidol, chlorpromazine, and clozapine are antagonists at receptors in the brain for dopamine. Other drugs act by binding to a receptor and mimicking the normal neurotransmitter. Such drugs are called receptor agonists. An example of a receptor agonist is morphine, an opiate that mimics effects of the endogenous neurotransmitter β-endorphin to relieve pain. Other drugs interfere with the deactivation of a neurotransmitter after it has been released, thereby prolonging the action of a neurotransmitter. This can be accomplished by blocking re-uptake or inhibiting degradative enzymes. Lastly, drugs can also prevent an action potential from occurring, blocking neuronal activity throughout the central and peripheral nervous system. Drugs such as tetrodotoxin that block neural activity are typically lethal.

Drugs targeting the neurotransmitter of major systems affect the whole system, which can explain the complexity of action of some drugs. Cocaine, for example, blocks the re-uptake of dopamine back into the presynaptic neuron, leaving the neurotransmitter molecules in the synaptic gap for an extended period of time. Since the dopamine remains in the synapse longer, the neurotransmitter continues to bind to the receptors on the postsynaptic neuron, eliciting a pleasurable emotional response. Physical addiction to cocaine may result from prolonged exposure to excess dopamine in the synapses, which leads to the downregulation of some post-synaptic receptors. After the effects of the drug wear off, an individual can become depressed due to decreased probability of the neurotransmitter binding to a receptor. Fluoxetine is a selective serotonin re-uptake inhibitor (SSRI), which blocks re-uptake of serotonin by the presynaptic cell which increases the amount of serotonin present at the synapse and furthermore allows it to remain there longer, providing potential for the effect of naturally released serotonin. AMPT prevents the conversion of tyrosine to L-DOPA, the precursor to dopamine; reserpine prevents dopamine storage within vesicles; and deprenyl inhibits monoamine oxidase (MAO)-B and thus increases dopamine levels.

Agonists

An agonist is a chemical capable of binding to a receptor, such as a neurotransmitter receptor, and initiating the same reaction typically produced by the binding of the endogenous substance. An agonist of a neurotransmitter will thus initiate the same receptor response as the transmitter. In neurons, an agonist drug may activate neurotransmitter receptors either directly or indirectly. Direct-binding agonists can be further characterized as full agonists, partial agonists, inverse agonists.

Direct agonists act similar to a neurotransmitter by binding directly to its associated receptor site(s), which may be located on the presynaptic neuron or postsynaptic neuron, or both. Typically, neurotransmitter receptors are located on the postsynaptic neuron, while neurotransmitter autoreceptors are located on the presynaptic neuron, as is the case for monoamine neurotransmitters; in some cases, a neurotransmitter utilizes retrograde neurotransmission, a type of feedback signaling in neurons where the neurotransmitter is released postsynaptically and binds to target receptors located on the presynaptic neuron. Nicotine, a compound found in tobacco, is a direct agonist of most nicotinic acetylcholine receptors, mainly located in cholinergic neurons. Opiates, such as morphine, heroin, hydrocodone, oxycodone, codeine, and methadone, are μ-opioid receptor agonists; this action mediates their euphoriant and pain relieving properties.

Indirect agonists increase the binding of neurotransmitters at their target receptors by stimulating the release or preventing the reuptake of neurotransmitters. Some indirect agonists trigger neurotransmitter release and prevent neurotransmitter reuptake. Amphetamine, for example, is an indirect agonist of postsynaptic dopamine, norepinephrine, and serotonin receptors in each their respective neurons; it produces both neurotransmitter release into the presynaptic neuron and subsequently the synaptic cleft and prevents their reuptake from the synaptic cleft by activating TAAR1, a presynaptic G protein-coupled receptor, and binding to a site on VMAT2, a type of monoamine transporter located on synaptic vesicles within monoamine neurons.

Antagonists 

An antagonist is a chemical that acts within the body to reduce the physiological activity of another chemical substance (as an opiate); especially one that opposes the action on the nervous system of a drug or a substance occurring naturally in the body by combining with and blocking its nervous receptor.

There are two main types of antagonist: direct-acting Antagonist and indirect-acting Antagonists:
 Direct-acting antagonist- which takes up space present on receptors which are otherwise taken up by neurotransmitters themselves. This results in neurotransmitters being blocked from binding to the receptors. The most common is called Atropine.
 Indirect-acting antagonist- drugs that inhibit the release/production of neurotransmitters (e.g., Reserpine).

Drug antagonists 
An antagonist drug is one that attaches (or binds) to a site called a receptor without activating that receptor to produce a biological response. It is therefore said to have no intrinsic activity. An antagonist may also be called a receptor "blocker" because they block the effect of an agonist at the site. The pharmacological effects of an antagonist, therefore, result in preventing the corresponding receptor site's agonists (e.g., drugs, hormones, neurotransmitters) from binding to and activating it. Antagonists may be "competitive" or "irreversible".

A competitive antagonist competes with an agonist for binding to the receptor. As the concentration of antagonist increases, the binding of the agonist is progressively inhibited, resulting in a decrease in the physiological response. High concentration of an antagonist can completely inhibit the response. This inhibition can be reversed, however, by an increase of the concentration of the agonist, since the agonist and antagonist compete for binding to the receptor. Competitive antagonists, therefore, can be characterized as shifting the dose–response relationship for the agonist to the right. In the presence of a competitive antagonist, it takes an increased concentration of the agonist to produce the same response observed in the absence of the antagonist.

An irreversible antagonist binds so strongly to the receptor as to render the receptor unavailable for binding to the agonist. Irreversible antagonists may even form covalent chemical bonds with the receptor. In either case, if the concentration of the irreversible antagonist is high enough, the number of unbound receptors remaining for agonist binding may be so low that even high concentrations of the agonist do not produce the maximum biological response.

Precursors

While intake of neurotransmitter precursors does increase neurotransmitter synthesis, evidence is mixed as to whether neurotransmitter release and postsynaptic receptor firing is increased. Even with increased neurotransmitter release, it is unclear whether this will result in a long-term increase in neurotransmitter signal strength, since the nervous system can adapt to changes such as increased neurotransmitter synthesis and may therefore maintain constant firing. Some neurotransmitters may have a role in depression and there is some evidence to suggest that intake of precursors of these neurotransmitters may be useful in the treatment of mild and moderate depression.

Catecholamine and trace amine precursors
L-DOPA, a precursor of dopamine that crosses the blood–brain barrier, is used in the treatment of Parkinson's disease. For depressed patients where low activity of the neurotransmitter norepinephrine is implicated, there is only little evidence for benefit of neurotransmitter precursor administration. L-phenylalanine and L-tyrosine are both precursors for dopamine, norepinephrine, and epinephrine. These conversions require vitamin B6, vitamin C, and S-adenosylmethionine. A few studies suggest potential antidepressant effects of L-phenylalanine and L-tyrosine, but there is much room for further research in this area.

Serotonin precursors

Administration of L-tryptophan, a precursor for serotonin, is seen to double the production of serotonin in the brain. It is significantly more effective than a placebo in the treatment of mild and moderate depression. This conversion requires vitamin C. 5-hydroxytryptophan (5-HTP), also a precursor for serotonin, is more effective than a placebo.

Diseases and disorders 
Diseases and disorders may also affect specific neurotransmitter systems. The following are disorders involved in either an increase, decrease, or imbalance of certain neurotransmitters.

Dopamine:

For example, problems in producing dopamine (mainly in the substantia nigra) can result in Parkinson's disease, a disorder that affects a person's ability to move as they want to, resulting in stiffness, tremors or shaking, and other symptoms. Some studies suggest that having too little or too much dopamine or problems using dopamine in the thinking and feeling regions of the brain may play a role in disorders like schizophrenia or attention deficit hyperactivity disorder (ADHD). Dopamine is also involved in addiction and drug use, as most recreational drugs cause an influx of dopamine in the brain (especially opioid and methamphetamines) that produces a pleasurable feeling, which is why users constantly crave drugs.

Serotonin:

Similarly, after some research suggested that drugs that block the recycling, or reuptake, of serotonin seemed to help some people diagnosed with depression, it was theorized that people with depression might have lower-than-normal serotonin levels. Though widely popularized, this theory was not borne out in subsequent research. Therefore, selective serotonin reuptake inhibitors (SSRIs) are used to increase the amounts of serotonin in synapses.

Glutamate:

Furthermore, problems with producing or using glutamate have been suggestively and tentatively linked to many mental disorders, including autism, obsessive–compulsive disorder (OCD), schizophrenia, and depression. Having too much glutamate has been linked to neurological diseases such as Parkinson's disease, multiple sclerosis, Alzheimer's disease, stroke, and ALS (amyotrophic lateral sclerosis).

Neurotransmitter imbalance
Generally, there are no scientifically established "norms" for appropriate levels or "balances" of different neurotransmitters. It is in most cases pragmatically impossible to even measure levels of neurotransmitters in a brain or body at any distinct moments in time. Neurotransmitters regulate each other's release, and weak consistent imbalances in this mutual regulation were linked to temperament in healthy people. Strong imbalances or disruptions to neurotransmitter systems have been associated with many diseases and mental disorders. These include Parkinson's, depression, insomnia, Attention Deficit Hyperactivity Disorder (ADHD), anxiety, memory loss, dramatic changes in weight and addictions. Chronic physical or emotional stress can be a contributor to neurotransmitter system changes. Genetics also plays a role in neurotransmitter activities. Apart from recreational use, medications that directly and indirectly interact with one or more transmitter or its receptor are commonly prescribed for psychiatric and psychological issues. Notably, drugs interacting with serotonin and norepinephrine are prescribed to patients with problems such as depression and anxiety—though the notion that there is much solid medical evidence to support such interventions has been widely criticized. Studies shown that dopamine imbalance has an influence on multiple sclerosis and other neurological disorders.

See also 

BK channel#Cellular level
Kiss-and-run fusion
Natural neuroactive substance
Neuroendocrine
Neuroendocrinology
Neuropsychopharmacology
Neurotransmission
Neurotransmitter analog
Neurotransmitter release
Neural pathway
Neuromodulation

Notes

References

External links 

Neurotransmitters and Neuroactive Peptides at Neuroscience for Kids website

 
Molecular neuroscience
Neuroscience